Diamond Star Halos is the twelfth studio album by the English rock band Def Leppard. It was released on 27 May 2022 through Bludgeon Riffola and Mercury Records, and is the band's first studio album in nearly seven years since 2015's Def Leppard. The album takes its name from the 1971 T. Rex single "Get It On" and includes imagery from Anton Corbijn, Maryam Malakpour, and Oliver and Joshua Munden.

Critical reception 

Ultimate Classic Rocks Michael Gallucci called the album "most obvious callback to glam's glory days as well as their own past triumphs", claiming that the band have learned to not "mess with what works" unlike past projects Slang and X. Having noted influences of glam rock stars David Bowie, Mott the Hoople and T. Rex, Gallucci also wrote that while, "like most tribute albums, the take-and-give results on Diamond Star Halos don't always match what was heard the first time around", "the band hasn't sounded this invigorated on record since the early '90s." The Arts Desks Joe Muggs wrote that "this album starts and ends so brilliantly", starting with "a salvo of three tracks that remind you exactly why Def Leppard became one of the biggest bands in the world in the mid Eighties" and ending with "heavily Queen-indebted high drama closer 'From Here to Eternity'", a "grand way to close a record", contrasting with a middle section that is "way too generic, slightly countrified and very American soft rock" and "can't really live up" to "these great bookends".

Blabbermouth.nets Dom Lawson explains the band's appeal as being because they "have never stopped behaving like the wide-eyed, priapic teenagers they were when they penned 'Hello America' all those years ago" rather than "resting on their laurels, touring the world on an endless nostalgia trip and never again making a new album", and that while the band are "relaxed" and the album "low on shiny bells and high-tech whistles", "it compensates by being (mainly) full of simple, heartfelt and punchy songs" and "is a very good time had by all." Louder Sounds Neil Jeffries called "SOS Emergency", "All We Need", "Open Your Eyes", "Gimme a Kiss", and "Unbreakable" "especially strong" and "stadium pleasers in the grand Leppard tradition"; and the album "best appreciated as a double album: three sides, each begun by three rockers and ending with a change of pace, then a shorter fourth side that abandons the pattern and goes out on the high of [Rick] Savage's 'From Here to Eternity', an epic track with a swinging, Pink Floyd-like tempo." The Telegraphs James Hall also emphasised the album's "[not messing] with the formula" in comparison to Slang, save for the "fascinating curveballs" brought in the form of the Alison Krauss-featuring "This Guitar" and "Lifeless", the former of which Hall called the better of the two and "a subtle (by Def Leppard standards) ballad that could well turn out to be a smash in the Nashville country charts." AllMusic's Stephen Thomas Erlewine wrote that "Leppard crank up the hooks, melodies, and amplifiers, adding little bits of distinctive flair along the way", noting that "its individual moments may not be excessive" but "the cumulative effect is almost overwhelming, especially as Def Leppard gives it their all in each cut."

Year-end lists

Track listing

Personnel

Def Leppard
Joe Elliott – lead vocals, guitar (8, 12, 14), additional engineering
Phil Collen – guitar (1-7, 9-15), backing vocals (1), additional engineering
Rick Savage – bass guitar, guitar (1-3, 15), backing vocals (1), additional engineering
Vivian Campbell – guitar, backing vocals (1), additional engineering
Rick Allen – drums

Additional personnel
Ronan McHugh – producer, drum programmer, editor, engineer, mixing
Joe LaPorta – mastering engineer
Debbi Blackwell-Cook – backing vocals (2, 3,  11, 12)
Dave Bassett – backing vocals (2, 3)
Alison Krauss – lead vocals (4, 13)
Ross Hogarth – recording engineer (4, 8, 12)
Eric Gorfain – string arrangements (4, 8, 12)
Mike Garson – piano (8, 12)

Charts

References

2022 albums
Def Leppard albums
Mercury Records albums
Glam rock albums by English artists